The 2017 Service King 300 was the fifth stock car race of the 2017 NASCAR Xfinity Series season and the 19th iteration of the event. The race was held on Saturday, March 25, 2017, in Fontana, California, at Auto Club Speedway, a  permanent D-shaped oval racetrack. The race took the scheduled 150 laps to complete. At race's end, Kyle Larson, driving for Chip Ganassi Racing, would defend against eventual second-place finisher, Team Penske driver Joey Logano, on the final restart with four to go to win his sixth career NASCAR Xfinity Series win and his first of the season. To fill out the podium, Kyle Busch of Joe Gibbs Racing finished third.

Background 

Auto Club Speedway (formerly California Speedway) is a 2 miles (3.2 km), low-banked, D-shaped oval superspeedway in Fontana, California which has hosted NASCAR racing annually since 1997. It is also used for open wheel racing events. The racetrack is located near the former locations of Ontario Motor Speedway and Riverside International Raceway. The track is owned and operated by International Speedway Corporation and is the only track owned by ISC to have naming rights sold. The speedway is served by the nearby Interstate 10 and Interstate 15 freeways as well as a Metrolink station located behind the backstretch.

Entry list 

 (R) denotes rookie driver.
 (i) denotes driver who is ineligible for series driver points.

*Withdrew.

**Withdrew after Bilicki refused rides with the team, after multiple incidents with the team. Leicht would then proceed to drive the #97, renumbering the #77.

Practice

First practice 
The first practice session was held on Friday, March 24, at 12:00 PM PST, and would last for 55 minutes.

Second and final practice 
The second and final practice session, sometimes referred to as Happy Hour, was held on Friday, March 24, at 2:00 PM PST, and would last for 55 minutes.

Qualifying 
Qualifying took place on Saturday, March 23, at 9:30 AM PST. Since Auto Club Speedway is at least 2 miles (3.2 km) in length, the qualifying system was a single car, single lap, two round system where in the first round, everyone would set a time to determine positions 13-40. Then, the fastest 12 qualifiers would move on to the second round to determine positions 1-12.

No drivers would fail to qualify.

Full qualifying results

Race results 
Stage 1 Laps: 35

Stage 2 Laps: 35

Stage 3 Laps: 80

Standings after the race 

Drivers' Championship standings

Note: Only the first 12 positions are included for the driver standings.

References 

2017 NASCAR Xfinity Series
NASCAR races at Auto Club Speedway
March 2017 sports events in the United States
2017 in sports in California